The Stockton-Ray House, near Edmonton in Metcalfe County, Kentucky, was built in 1808.  It was listed on the National Register of Historic Places in 1992.

Its original part is a two-story three-bay brick Hall-and-Parlor-plan structure, with end chimneys.  A frame addition was added to the rear around 1865.

References

Houses on the National Register of Historic Places in Kentucky
Federal architecture in Kentucky
Houses completed in 1808
National Register of Historic Places in Metcalfe County, Kentucky
1808 establishments in Kentucky
Hall and parlor houses